Obaidullah (born 4 June 1992) is a Pakistani cricketer. He made his first-class debut for Pakistan International Airlines in the 2016–17 Quaid-e-Azam Trophy on 7 October 2016. He made his Twenty20 debut for Peshawar in the 2017–18 National T20 Cup on 19 November 2017.

References

External links
 

1992 births
Living people
Pakistani cricketers
Pakistan International Airlines cricketers
Peshawar cricketers
Cricketers from Peshawar